A list of rowing clubs in Australia, sorted by Rowing Australia member association regions. Rowing blades used by the club are shown, if known.

Australia Capital Territory
Rowing ACT 
 ACT Academy of Sport Rowing
 Australian Defence Force Academy
 Australian National University Boat Club
 Black Mountain Rowing Club 
 Canberra Girls Grammar School Rowing Association
 Canberra Grammar School Rowing Association
 Canberra Rowing Club
 Capital Lakes Rowing Club
 Daramalan College Rowing Club
 Lake Tuggeranong Rowing Club
 Radford College Rowing Club
 Royal Military College, Duntroon

New South Wales
Rowing NSW

Great Public Schools of NSW (AAGPS) Schools
 Newington 
 Riverview
 St Joseph's College
 Sydney Boys High
 Sydney Grammar
 King's
 Scots
 Shore

Other Public Schools
 Arthur Phillip High School
 Glebe High School
 Mackellar Girls Campus
 Nowra High School
 Riverside Girls High School
 North Sydney Girls High School
 Sydney Girls High School
 Taree High School
 Winmalee High School
 Wingham High School

Independent Schools

 Arden Anglican School
 Ascham School
 Cranbrook School 
 Kinross Wolaroi School	 
 Kotara High School
 Loreto Kirribilli
 Loreto Normanhurst 
 Macarthur Anglican School
 Maitland Grossmann High School
 Marist Catholic College North Shore
 McAuley Catholic College
 MLC School
 Mount Saint Benedict College
 Nowra Anglican College
 Presbyterian Ladies' College
 Pymble Ladies College 
 Queenwood School
 Redlands
 Rosebank College
 Roseville College
 Rouse Hill Anglican College
 Scone Grammar
 Shoalhaven Anglican School
 Shoalhaven High School
 St Andrew's Cathedral School
 St Augustines College
 St Josephs Regional College Port Macquarie
 St Paul's Grammar School
 Tara Anglican School for Girls 
 The Illawarra Grammar School
 Trinity Catholic College
 Warners Bay High School
 Westfields Sports High School
 Queenwood School For Girls

Metropolitan Clubs

 Balmain Rowing Club
 Drummoyne Rowing Club
 Kinross Wolaroi Rowing Club
 Leichhardt Rowing Club
 Macquarie University Rowing Club
 Mosman Rowing Club 
 Nepean Rowing Club
 Newington Masters Rowing Club Inc
 North Shore Rowing Club 
 Old Ignatians Rowing Club
 Penrith Rowing Club
 St George Rowing Club 
 Sydney Rowing Club 
 Sydney University Boat Club
 Sydney University Womens Boat Club
 Sydney Womens MLC Rowing Club
 Tara Boat Club
 The Lakes Rowers
 University of NSW Rowing Club 
 UTS Haberfield Rowing Club

Northern Rivers Clubs
 Grafton High School
 Grafton Rowing Club
 Iluka Rowing & Aquatic Club
 Lismore Rowing Club
 Lower Clarence Amateur RC
 Maclean High School
 Murwillumbah Rowing Club
 Richmond River Sailing & Rowing Club
 South Grafton High School

Central District Clubs
 Armidale Rowing Club
 Brisbane Water Rowing Club
 Central Coast Rowing Club
 Endeavour Rowing Club 
 Hastings Regional Rowing Club
 Hunter Valley Grammar School
 Lake Macquarie Rowing Club
 Manning River Rowing Club
 Newcastle Grammar School
 Newcastle Rowing Club 
 Newcastle University Boat Club
 Port Macquarie Rowing Club
 Upper Hunter Rowing Club

Independent Clubs
 Brisbane Water Rowing Club
 Shellharbour City Rowing Club
 Shoalhaven Rowing Club

Queensland
Rowing Queensland

Greater Public Schools Association of Queensland
 Anglican Church Grammar School 
 Brisbane Boys College
 Brisbane Grammar School
 Brisbane State High School
 St Joseph's College, Gregory Terrace 
 St Joseph's College, Nudgee
 The Southport School

North Queensland
 Cairns Rowing Club, Trinity Inlet
 Innisfail Rowing Club, Johnstone River
 Mackay Rowing Club, Pioneer River
 Riverway Rowing Club, Ross River
 Tablelands Country Rowing Club, Lake Tinaroo
 Townsville & James Cook University Rowing Club, Aplins Weir

Sunshine Coast
 Boreen Point Rowers, Lake Cootharaba
 Noosa Boat Club, 	Lake Macdonald
 Noosa Yacht and Rowing Club, Noosa River
 Sunshine Coast Rowing Club, Maroochy River
 Maroochy River Rowing Club, Maroochy River

Central Queensland
 Bundaberg Rowing Club, Burnett River and Bullyard Creek
 Grammarians Rowing Club, Fitzroy River
 Rockhampton Fitzroy Rowing Club, Fitzroy River
 Wide Bay Rowing Club Inc.
 1770 Dragons, 1770 Agnes Water

Metropolitan

 Brisbane & GPS Rowing Club, Brisbane River
 Brisbane Grammarians Rowing Club, Brisbane River
 Centenary Rowing Club, Brisbane River
 Coastal Rowing and Touring Australia Inc 	
 College Masters Rowing Club, Brisbane River
 Commercial Rowing Club, Brisbane River 
 Dragons Rowing Club, Breakfast Creek/ Brisbane River
 Dutton Park Rowing & Supporters Club, Brisbane River
 Kand Rowing Club, Brisbane River
 Lourdes Rowing Club, Brisbane River
 Pine Rivers Rowing Club, Lake Kurwongbah
 Redlegs Rowing Club, Brisbane River
 Rivercity Womens Rowing Club, Brisbane River
 Tattersall's Rowing Club,	Brisbane River
 Toowong Rowing Club, Brisbane River 
 University of Queensland Boat Club, Brisbane River
 Vintage Vikings Rowing Club, Brisbane River
 VOMITS, Brisbane River

Gold Coast
 Bond University Rowing Club, Lake Orr
 Coomera Watersports Club,	Coomera River
 Gold Coast Masters Rowers, Lake Orr
 Griffith University Surfers Paradise Rowing Club,	Nerang River
 Murwillimbah Rowing Club,	Tweed River
 Oxenford Rowing Club, Coomera River
 Somerset Boat Club
 Tweed Heads and Coolangatta Rowing Club, 	Terranora Inlet

South Australia
Rowing South Australia 

 Adelaide High School
 Adelaide Rowing Club 
 Adelaide University Boat Club 
 Berri Rowing Club
 Christian Brothers College
 Goolwa Rowing Club
 Limestone Coast Rowing
 Loreto College Rowing Club
 Mannum Rowing Club
 Murray Bridge Rowing Club
 Norwood Morialta High School
 Ocean View College Rowing Club
 Pembroke School
 Phoenix Rowing Club
 Port Adelaide Rowing Club
 Port Pirie Rowing Club
 Prince Alfred College 
 Pulteney Grammar School
 Renmark Rowing Club
 Riverside Rowing Club
 Scotch College
 Seymour College
 South Port Surf Life Saving Club Inc
 Saint Ignatius' College
 St Michaels College Rowing Club
 St Peter's College 
 St Peter's Girls College Rowing Club
 Tailem Bend Rowing Club
 Torrens Rowing Club 
 Unley Boat Club
 Unley High School
 Waikerie Rowing Club
 Walford Anglican School for Girls
 Wallaroo Rowing Club
 Wilderness School

Tasmania
Rowing Tasmania

 Derwent Mercantile Collegiate Rowing Club 
 Fahan School
 Huon Rowing Club
 Lindisfarne Rowing Club
 New Norfolk Rowing Club
 Sandy Bay Rowing Club
 St Mary's College, Hobart
 St Virgil's College
 Tamar Rowing Club
 Tasmanian Institute of Sport
 Tasmania University Boat Club
 The Friends School
 The Hutchins School 
 University of Tasmania Launceston Boat Club

Victoria
Rowing Victoria

Associations
 Ballarat Rowing Association
 Head of the Schoolgirls Regatta
 Rowing Geelong
 Murray Rowing Association

Clubs

 1907 TC Boat Club
 Albert Park - South Melbourne Rowing Club
 Bairnsdale Rowing Club
 Ballarat City Rowing Club
 Banks Rowing Club 
 Barwon Rowing Club
 Bendigo Rowing Club
 Cardinal Rowing Club
 Carrum Rowing Club 
 Caulfield Grammarians Rowing Club
 City of Warrnambool Rowing Club
 Corio Bay Rowing Club
 Corowa Rowing Club
 Dimboola Rowing Club
 Essendon Rowing Club
 Footscray City Rowing Club
 Hamilton Rowing Club
 Hawthorn Rowing Club
 Horsham City Rowing Club
 Lake Colac Rowing Club
 La Trobe University Boat Club
 Melbourne Argonauts Rowing Club
 Melbourne Rowing Club
 Melbourne University Boat Club
 Mercantile Rowing Club
 Mildura Rowing Club
 Nagambie Rowing Club
 Old Melburnians Rowing Club	
 The Pirates (rowing club)
 Powerhouse Rowing Club
 Ramsey-Morris Club
 Richmond Rowing Club
 Rutherglen Rowing Club
 Sale Rowing Club
 Shepparton Rowing Club 
 Wahgunyah Rowing Club
 Wendouree Ballarat Rowing Club
 Wentworth District Rowing Club
 Y Rowing Club
 Yarra Yarra Rowing Club 
 Yarrawonga Rowing Club

Schools

 Ballarat Clarendon College
 Ballarat Grammar School
 Ballarat High School
 Brighton Grammar School
 Carey Baptist Grammar School
 Catholic College - Sale
 Caulfield Grammar School 
 Christian College Geelong
 Clonard College
 Damascus College Ballarat
 Emmanuel College, Melbourne
 Fintona Girls' School
 Firbank Grammar School
 Frankston High School
 Geelong College
 Geelong Grammar School
 Genazzano FCJ College
 Gippsland Grammar
 Haileybury College
 Kardinia International College
 Korowa Anglican Girls' School
 Lauriston Girls' School 
 Loreto College, Ballarat
 Loreto Mandeville Hall
 Lowther Hall Anglican Grammar School
 Matthew Flinders Girls Secondary College
 Melbourne Girls College
 Melbourne Girls Grammar School
 Melbourne Grammar School 
 Melbourne High School
 Methodist Ladies' College
 Presbyterian Ladies' College, Melbourne
 Ruyton Girls' School 
 Sacred Heart College, Geelong
 Scotch College
 St Catherine's School
 St Kevin's College
 St Patrick's College
 Shelford Girls' Grammar
 Strathcona Baptist Girls Grammar School
 Hamilton and Alexandra College
 Toorak College
 Warrnambool College
 Wesley College
 Xavier College

Western Australia
Rowing WA

Clubs

 Albany Rowing Club
 ANA Rowing Club
 Bunbury Rowing Club
 Champion Lakes Boat Club
 Curtin University  Boat Club
 Fremantle Rowing Club
 Greenough River Rowing Club
 Perth Rowing Club
Murdoch University Rowing Club
 Swan River Rowing Club
 West Australian Rowing Club
University of Western Australia Boat Club

Schools
 Aquinas College 
 Christ Church Grammar School
 Guildford Grammar School 
 Hale School
 John XXIII College
 Methodist Ladies College
 Penrhos College
 Perth College
 Presbyterian Ladies' College
 Scotch College
 St Hilda's Anglican School for Girls
 Trinity College, Perth
 Wesley College
 Shenton College, Perth

See also

List of Australian rules football clubs in Australia
List of cricket clubs in Australia
List of baseball teams in Australia
List of rugby league clubs in Australia
List of rugby union clubs in Australia
List of soccer clubs in Australia
List of yacht clubs in Australia
List of rowing blades
Rowing Australia

References

 
Rowing
Australia
Rowing